Korobitsyno is a rural locality on Karelian Isthmus, in Vyborgsky District of Leningrad Oblast, hosting three ski resorts: Zolotaya Dolina, Snezhny, and Krasnoye Ozero. 

Rural localities in Leningrad Oblast
Ski areas and resorts in Russia
Karelian Isthmus